Parliamentary elections were held in Colombia on 4 April 1937 to elect the Chamber of Representatives. The Liberal Party was the only party to contest the elections, and received 100% of the vote.

Results

References

Parliamentary elections in Colombia
One-party elections
Colombia
Parliamentary
Election and referendum articles with incomplete results